Hermon Presbyterian Church is a historic church at 446 Dave Lyle Boulevard in Rock Hill, South Carolina.

It was built in 1897 and added to the National Register of Historic Places in 1992.

References

Presbyterian churches in South Carolina
Churches on the National Register of Historic Places in South Carolina
Gothic Revival church buildings in South Carolina
Churches completed in 1897
19th-century Presbyterian church buildings in the United States
National Register of Historic Places in Rock Hill, South Carolina
African-American history of South Carolina
Buildings and structures in Rock Hill, South Carolina
Churches in York County, South Carolina